Formula RUS (Формула Русь) was a Russian formula racing class, corresponding to FIA's Formula Е category. The class was designed to help beginners and young karters make the transition to auto racing. The series ran from 2002 to 2007.

Formula RUS Championship

The Formula RUS Championship is a single-make Formula RUS series. Teams and drivers are restricted from making any changes to the car. The series organizers provide technical service to series participants and guarantee that all cars are identical, including car setup.

The aim of Formula RUS  is to provide a practical and realistic platform for the novice racing driver, with an emphasis on the provision of education and development of race craft.

In 1999 (and for the first time in Russian motor racing history), the concept of a mono-class, low budget, racing car first came about, and as a direct result of this concept and idea, the first batch of cars were produced. The car was designed so that it could be used for training drivers with very little racing experience and also for the purpose of taking part in official competitions. 

Since 2002 and after having undergone a full and thorough testing programme Formula RUS now has over seventy cars in operation– over thirty of which are in operation at any one time. Additionally, since 2002, Formula RUS has carried out the «Formula RUS Championship», which in 2003 was granted the status of the Championship of Russia.

During the five years of its existence, the formula has taken part in more than seventy races and carried out more than one hundred and seventy testing days. The series has also trained over two hundred and sixty racing drivers of ages ranging from sixteen to sixty – all of them with various degrees of racing skills and abilities and from the many various regions of the Russian Federation and the CIS.

Many Russian racing drivers owe the start of their careers in motorsport to Formula RUS.

Technical specification
 Formula Rus racing car, model FR 02/2 has been developed and is being manufactured by “AKKC Motorsport”, a structural division of “Rash’n’Race”. AKKC Motorsport is the manufacturer of components and spare parts.

Champions
All teams and drivers were Russian-registered.

External links

Formula RUS official website
Formula RUS PHOTO

Video
 OPEN FOR ITSELF Formula RUS
 Formula RUS
 Formula RUS 2006

RUS
RUS
Auto racing series in Russia
Recurring sporting events established in 2002
Recurring sporting events disestablished in 2007
Defunct auto racing series
2002 establishments in Russia
One-make series
2007 disestablishments in Russia
Defunct sports competitions in Russia